Kokoda Barracks is an army barracks in Devonport on the northwest coast of Tasmania. The Barracks is the home of the 160 Transport Troop, 44th Transport Squadron which is a sub-unit of the 2nd Force Support Battalion. Kokoda is also home to the Army and Australian Air Force Cadets living in the area.

References

Barracks in Australia
Devonport, Tasmania
Military installations in Tasmania